The Myanmar Davis Cup team represents Myanmar in Davis Cup tennis competition and are governed by the Tennis Federation of Myanmar.

They have not competed since 2018.

They finished third in Group IV in 2003.

History
Myanmar competed in its first Davis Cup in 1955, but competed in only two ties until 2003.

Last team (2018) 

 Aung Myo Thant
 Tin Myo Wai
 Aung Kyaw Naing (Captain-player)
 Zaw San Oo

See also
Davis Cup

External links

Davis Cup teams
Davis Cup
Davis Cup